Lieutenant-General George Allan MacKenzie CMM, CD (December 15, 1931 – September 10, 2012) was a Canadian air force general who served as Commander, Air Command in Canada from 1978 to 1980.

Career
MacKenzie joined the Royal Canadian Air Force in 1950 and trained as a pilot. He became Commander of Maritime Air Group before being appointed Commander, Air Command in 1978 and retiring in 1980.

In retirement he became President and Chief Executive Officer of Gendis Inc. He also served a year as President of Sony of Canada.

References

Commanders of the Order of Military Merit (Canada)
Canadian Forces Air Command generals
1931 births
2012 deaths